Jabda is a small village in the Purba Medinipur district in the Indian state of West Bengal.

Economy 
Eighty percent of the population work in agriculture, primarily grain and paddy.

Education 
One high school and four primary schools serve the village.

Festivals 
The largest fair is Rash Mela, a ten-day event held in November. Cultural functions are held and singers, dancers and musicians come from all parts of the south-state to participate. 

The Rash Yatra Festival is celebrated to remember the love story of Lord Krishna and his beloved Radha, including the glorious days that he spent in Brindyavan. It presents various stalls of delicacies of papad, Jilipi, Goja, Satpuri and many other Bengali dishes.

References 

Villages in Purba Medinipur district